The Oku people or the Aku Marabout or Aku Mohammedans are an ethnic group in Sierra Leone and the Gambia, primarily the descendants of marabout, liberated Yoruba people who were released from slave ships and resettled in Sierra Leone as Liberated Africans or came as settlers in the mid-19th century.

Some Oku historically have intermarried since then with ethnic groups in Sierra Leone and the Gambia such as the Mandingo, Temne, Mende, and in some cases with the ethnic Sierra Leone Creole people. The Creole are primarily descendants of African-American former slaves, as well as some from Jamaica, Nova Scotia, and slaves liberated from illegal slave trading in the 19th century. The Oku people primarily reside in the communities of Fourah Bay, Fula Town, and Aberdeen.

The official cemetery of  Oku People from Fourah Bay is the Aku Mohammedan Cemetery on Kennedy Street. About 99% of the Oku are Muslim. A very small minority of Oku people may have recently converted to Christianity in the late twentieth century. They are known for their inquisitive nature, adventurous spirit, and valuable tradition primarily influenced by marabout and to a lesser extent griot folklore. They have practiced Sub-Saharan passages such as cliterodotomy since the late-19th century. A large number of them embraced Western education and other elements of Western culture prior to the Sierra Leone Civil War. The Oku people were able to translate ideologies that spread throughout the Sahel in the 11th-century. The Atiq Mosque is the central mosque of the Fourah Bay Community, similar to the Conakry Grand Mosque and The Great Mosque of Touba.

During British rule, the colonial government officially recognized various Oku neighborhoods as historical communities in Sierra Leone. During the 20th-century a railway system provided agriculture and consumer goods to a newly independent Freetown. Since independence the national Sierra Leonean government has classified the Oku people as non-native Creoles although the Oku people are distinct from the Sierra Leone Creoles.

The Oku people have an extensive diaspora with Oku communities established in The Gambia and in Sierra Leone. The Oku people in Sierra Leone reside mainly in the capital cities of Banjul while the latter are in Freetown. In Sierra Leone the neighborhoods belonging to the Oku People are Fula Town, Fourah Bay, and some parts of Aberdeen Village (which has other areas occupied by Creoles).

Origin
While the Africans repatriated from England, North America, and 
the Caribbean between 1787 and 1800 came with their plethora of Christian churches and train of missionaries, the Oku people are descended exclusively from Muslim Yoruba Liberated Africans who were resettled in Sierra Leone during the nineteenth century. The Yoruba Muslim elements among the general Liberated African population,  formed a distinctive community and as early as the 1840s, there were references in documents and journals.

Prominent Oku families include the Dahniya, Zubairu, Mahdi, Iscandari, Aziz, Mustapha, Rashid, Abdullah, Lewally, Bassir, Deen, Tejan, Savage, and some adopted Oku families acquired Creole surnames such as Cole, Williams, Carew, Gerber, Spilsbury, and Joaque. Some of the European or Creole surnames of the Oku people were appropriated to gain entry into colonial schools in Freetown and others retained European surnames given or assigned to their Aku Liberated African ancestors.

Culture
The Oku people have a distinctive culture that has strong similarities to that of larger communities of Muslim who adhere to Ajami script. The Oku practice cliterodotomy alongside other indigenous ethnic groups in Sierra Leone. The Oku often have Arabic names. Some Oku people later adopted the names of prominent benefactors such as Carew, in addition to Yoruba and other Nigerian names, which they thought aided admission into the Islamic schools founded by Fula and Mandinka people in Freetown. Some elder members of the Oku community continue to speak a traditional language such as Temne, Mende, Pular, Mandingo, and Soso while fluent in Yoruba, Krio or English language.

Relationship with the Sierra Leone Creole people
Several scholars such as Ramatoulie Onikepo Othman and Olumbe Bassir classify the Oku people as distinct from the Creoles because of their ancestry and strong Muslim culture.

In contrast to the Oku people, the Creoles or Krio are Christian and are a mixture of various ethnic groups including African Americans, Afro-Caribbeans, and Liberated Africans of Igbo, Fanti, Aja, Nupe, Bakongo, and Yoruba descent in addition to other African ethnic groups and European ancestry.  Furthermore, unlike the Oku people, the Creoles do not practice cliterodotomy, engage in the Bundu society, and are monogamous.

More recently, some scholars consider the Oku people to be a sub-ethnic group of the Creoles, based on their close association with British colonists and their adoption of Western education and other aspects of culture.
Those classifying the Oku as part of the Sierra Leone Creole people note their adoption of similar English or European surnames (although this was a minority of Oku) and cultural aspects such as komojade, egungun, gelede, hunters' masquerade, esusu and awujoh. However, as scholars have outlined, the few cultural similarities between the Creole and Oku people are because there are some Yoruba cultural retentions from the Christianized Yoruba Liberated Africans  (who are one ethnic group among the many diverse ethnic ancestors of the Creoles) found among the Creoles and because the cultural orientation, heritage, identity and origin of the Oku people are Yoruba in essence.

Cultural associations
The Oku people are represented by cultural associations such as the Ebilleh Cultural Organization, aiming to preserve and enhance Oku heritage of Sierra Leone and the Gambia.

Notable Oku in or from Sierra Leone

Olumbe Bassir, scientist
Mohammed Shitta Bey, businessman, aristocrat and philanthropist 
Abdul Tejan-Cole, legal practitioner and former Commissioner of Sierra Leone's Anti-Corruption Commission.
Ahmed Deen, footballer
Bill Hamid, footballer
Isha Johansen (née Savage), president of Sierra Leonean Football Association
Haja Afsatu Kabba (née Savage), politician
Michael Lahoud, footballer
Nemata Majeks-Walker (née Mahdi), women's activist
Ramatoulie Othman, writer
Umaru Rahman, footballer 
Mohamed Sanusi Tejan, Muslim scholar 
Madieu Williams, professional football athlete
 Mohamed Daramy, footballer
Gibril Wilson, professional football athlete
 Walid Shour, footballer

Notes

References

Oku people
Ethnic groups in Sierra Leone
Ethnic groups in the Gambia
Sierra Leonean people
Gambian people